Chardale R. Murray is an American politician. She is a former member of the South Carolina House of Representatives from the 116th District, serving since 2020. She is a member of the Democratic party. Murray was defeated by Republican Matt Leber in the 2022 general election.

Electoral history

South Carolina House of Representatives

References

1975 births
Living people
Democratic Party members of the South Carolina House of Representatives
21st-century American politicians
African-American people in South Carolina politics
University of South Carolina alumni
21st-century American women politicians
Politicians from Charleston, South Carolina
21st-century African-American women
21st-century African-American politicians
20th-century African-American people
20th-century African-American women

Women state legislators in South Carolina